Karina Sævik (born 24 March 1996) is a Norwegian professional footballer who plays as an attacking midfielder or a winger for Toppserien club Avaldsnes and the Norway national team. She was selected to the team representing Norway at the 2019 FIFA Women's World Cup.

Club career
Sævik played for the club Avaldsnes IL from 2013 to 2015. She played for Kolbotn Fotball from 2016 to June 2019 and for Paris Saint-Germain from July 2019.

On 16 September 2020, German club Wolfsburg announced the signing of Sævik on a two-year deal.

Career statistics

Club

International

Scores and results list Norway's goal tally first, score column indicates score after each Sævik goal.

References

External links
 

1996 births
Living people
People from Haugesund
Norwegian women's footballers
Norway women's youth international footballers
Norway women's international footballers
Women's association football forwards
2019 FIFA Women's World Cup players
Toppserien players
Division 1 Féminine players
Frauen-Bundesliga players
Avaldsnes IL players
Kolbotn Fotball players
Paris Saint-Germain Féminine players
VfL Wolfsburg (women) players
Norwegian expatriate women's footballers
Norwegian expatriate sportspeople in France
Norwegian expatriate sportspeople in Germany
Expatriate women's footballers in France
Expatriate women's footballers in Germany
Sportspeople from Rogaland
UEFA Women's Euro 2022 players